Metham is a hamlet in the East Riding of Yorkshire, England. Metham forms part of the civil parish of Laxton.

History
Metham was the seat of the Metham family. A 16th-century Sir Thomas Metham, who was knighted during the reign of Queen Mary, was imprisoned under Queen Elizabeth I for practicing the Roman Catholic faith, and died at nearby York Castle in 1573. A 17th-century Sir Thomas Metham died at the Battle of Marston Moor during First English Civil War. In the battle he served for Charles I as captain of the Yorkshire gentlemen volunteers.

In 1823 Metham was a village in the civil parish of Howden, and the Wapentake of Howdenshire. The population of Metham in 1823 was 45, and included one farmer; two gentlemen, one of whom lived at Metham Hall; and two yeomen, one of whom lived at 'Bishopsoil'.

While the Metham Estate has existed for centuries prior, the current Metham Hall is on Metham Lane, and is a Grade II listed building and is of early 19th century origin.

References

Hamlets in the East Riding of Yorkshire